The 2009 Virginia attorney general election took place in Virginia on November 3, 2009. Incumbent Attorney General Bob McDonnell was eligible for re-election, but instead opted to successfully run for Governor of Virginia. McDonnell resigned from his position in 2009 to run for governor, being succeeded by his deputy, Bill Mims.

The Republican party nominated State Senator Ken Cuccinelli, who easily defeated the Democratic candidate, Delegate Steve Shannon. Concurrently, Republicans won the other two statewide offices and made gains in the House of Delegates. Cuccinelli would later make an unsuccessful run for Governor in 2013. 

This would be the last election until 2021 that a Republican would win the office of Attorney General in Virginia.

Republican nomination

Candidates

Nominated at convention
 Ken Cuccinelli, Member of the Virginia Senate from the 37th district

Defeated at convention
 John L. Brownlee, former United States Attorney for the Western District of Virginia
 Dave Foster, former member of the Arlington County School Board

Democratic primary

Candidates

Nominee
 Steve Shannon, Member of the Virginia House of Delegates from the 35th district and former Assistant Commonwealth's Attorney for Fairfax County

Withdrew
 John P. Fishwick Jr., attorney

See also 

 2009 Virginia elections
 2009 Virginia gubernatorial election
2009 Virginia House of Delegates election

References

2009 Virginia elections
Virginia Attorney General elections